Muscat is a governorate of the Sultanate of Oman. Its provincial capital is Muscat, which is the largest city and only metropolis of Oman. Muscat Governorate, commonly referred to as Muscat City, is the seat of government and contains Oman's first cruise and cargo port and oil port. Its population reached 1,288,330 as of May 2015.

Provinces
Muscat Governorate consists of six provinces (wilayat):
Al Amarat
Bawshar
Muscat (Old Town)
Muttrah
Qurayyat
Al Seeb

Demographics

References

 
Governorates of Oman